The Big Twitch is a 2005 non-fiction book by Australian writer Sean Dooley. It covers his 2002 attempt to break the record and see more than 700 birds in Australia in one year.

References

Birdwatching
Australian non-fiction books
2005 non-fiction books